Michał Marek Wójcik (born 17 April 1971 in Cracow) is a Polish politician. He was elected to Sejm on 25 September 2005, getting 7428 votes in 30 Rybnik district as a candidate from the Law and Justice list.

In 2021, when he was deputy Justice minister, he triggered a lot of foreign indignation by presenting a proposal to completely exclude same-sex couples from adoption. In Poland, single parents are allowed to adopt; some of the single parents were or became part of a same-sex couple. The new bill was meant to check and double-check the status of single parents before allowing adoption.

See also
Members of Polish Sejm 2005-2007

References

External links
Michał Wójcik - parliamentary page - includes declarations of interest, voting record, and transcripts of speeches.

1971 births
Living people
Politicians from Kraków
Members of the Polish Sejm 2005–2007
Members of the Polish Sejm 2015–2019
Members of the Polish Sejm 2019–2023
University of Silesia in Katowice alumni
Law and Justice politicians